K-Michel Parandi (Michel Kay Parandi) is a film director and screenwriter. In 2005, he wrote and directed a musical adaptation of the "Red Riding Hood" which won the art-direction award at the Festival du Film de Paris. Parandi is also known for having directed a series of confidential movies presenting a futuristic Dubai for the biotechnology park DuBiotech. In 2011 he was signed by Robert Newman (agent) at William Morris Endeavor before joining United Talent Agency.

Career

In June 2009, it was announced that controversial activist and notorious French filmmaker Mathieu Kassovitz known for his critical portrayal of France's historical and political figures 
would co-direct with Parandi a motion picture based on a science fiction mythology. From 2011 to 2013 Parandi was mentored by independent producers Hisami Kuroiwa and Ben Barenholtz.

By 2012, Parandi wrote and directed the original pilot for "From The Future With Love". In the series, the police is privatized and only provide protection if you've paid for it. The pilot was selected by the Art Directors Club of New York and was broadcast on March 14, 2016 at a TED event in Brussels. TED "Deep future" initiated a public discussion on the future of law enforcement.

Recognition

2000 : Best college screenplay at Angers European film festival. 
2005 : Best storyboard, Paris film festival, concours Sopadin 2005. Jury presided by Moebus aka Jean Giraud, and Gérard Krawczyk.
2013 : io9 "2013's 13 best of all Science Fiction and Fantasy" for "From the Future with Love".

External links
 http://www.shortoftheweek.com/2013/09/06/from-the-future-with-love * http://io9.com/a-world-where-you-buy-police-protection-just-like-you-b-480347422 *  * http://hecticelectric.nl/ * http://www.quietearth.us/articles/2013/09/Crime-Prevention-Costs-in-Amazing-FROM-THE-FUTURE-WITH-LOVE?f=1 * http://theawesomer.com/from-the-future-with-love/251051/  * http://www.konbini.com/fr/culture/court-metrage-from-the-future-with-love  * http://www.geeksaresexy.net/2013/09/09/must-watch-from-the-future-with-love-short-sci-fi-film  * http://www.sfsignal.com/archives/2013/09/sunday-cinema-from-the-future-with-love-a-short-film/  * http://www.adcglobal.org * http://www.macacomalandro.com.br/2013/09/curta-from-future-with-love.html * http://www.ibelieveinadv.com/
 http://www.redflyingfox.com

American film directors
American experimental filmmakers
Living people
Year of birth missing (living people)